Chet Thomas Holmgren (born May 1, 2002; pronounced  ) is an American professional basketball player for the Oklahoma City Thunder of the National Basketball Association (NBA). Drafted 2nd overall in the 2022 NBA draft, he played college basketball for the Gonzaga Bulldogs. A consensus five-star recruit and the number-one player in the 2021 class, he stands  and plays the center and power forward positions.

Early life and career
Holmgren was born in Minneapolis, Minnesota. He grew up playing basketball under the tutelage of his father, a former college player. In sixth grade (aged 11–12), he began attending Minnehaha Academy, a Christian private school in Minneapolis. Holmgren improved his shooting range while recovering from a broken right wrist during his first season.

High school career
As a freshman at Minnehaha Academy, Holmgren averaged 6.2 points and three rebounds per game. His team won its second straight Class 2A state championship. In his sophomore season, Holmgren averaged 18.6 points and 11 rebounds per game and led his team to another Class 2A state title. After the season, he had success with his Amateur Athletic Union team Grassroots Sizzle at the Under Armour Association, earning tournament most valuable player honors. As a result, he emerged as one of the highest ranked players in the 2021 class and started receiving more NCAA Division I interest. In August 2019, Holmgren attracted national attention for crossing over basketball player Stephen Curry at Curry's own SC30 Select Camp.

On January 4, 2020, as a junior, Holmgren recorded nine points, 10 rebounds, and 12 blocks in a nationally televised victory over Sierra Canyon School, a nationally ranked team featuring Bronny James, Brandon Boston Jr., and Ziaire Williams. In his junior season, he averaged 14.3 points per game, leading Minnehaha to a 25–3 record. 

As a senior, averaging 21 points and 12.3 rebounds, Holmgren won the Class 3A state title, his fourth state championship at Minnehaha. He was named Gatorade National Player of the Year, Naismith Prep Player of the Year, Morgan Wootten National Player of the Year, a McDonald's All-American, and Minnesota Mr. Basketball.

Recruiting
Entering his junior season, Holmgren had about 30 scholarship offers from college basketball programs. In June 2020, after the reclassification of Jonathan Kuminga, he became the number one player in the 2021 class, according to ESPN. On April 19, 2021, Holmgren announced his commitment and signed a National Letter of Intent to play college basketball for Gonzaga, following his former high school teammate Jalen Suggs.

College career
In his college debut, Holmgren tallied 14 points, 13 rebounds, 7 blocks and 6 assists in a 97–63 victory over Dixie State. He became the first player in 25 years to record at least 10 points, 10 rebounds, 5 assists, and 5 blocks in his debut. On November 22, the 7-foot freshman finished with 19 points on 7-of-9 shooting and 3 of 3 at the free-throw line. At the conclusion of the regular season, Holmgren was named West Coast Conference Defensive Player of the Year and Newcomer of the Year. At the NCAA tournament, Holmgren recorded 19 points, 17 rebounds, 7 blocks and 5 assists in their 93–72 opening round victory over Georgia State. As a freshman, he averaged 14.1 points, 9.9 rebounds and 3.7 blocks per game. On April 21, 2022, Holmgren declared for the 2022 NBA draft, forgoing his remaining college eligibility.

Professional career

Oklahoma City Thunder (2022–present)
The Oklahoma City Thunder selected Holmgren with the second overall pick in the 2022 NBA draft, making him the highest draft pick ever taken out of Gonzaga and the highest pick from the state of Minnesota, topping Kevin McHale. Holmgren joined the Thunder's 2022 NBA Summer League roster. 

In his Summer League debut, Holmgren scored 23 points with seven rebounds, four assists, and six blocks in a 98–77 win against the Utah Jazz. He also broke the record for the most blocks in a single Summer League game. On July 5, 2022, Holmgren signed a rookie-scale contract with the Thunder.

On August 25, 2022, it was announced that Holmgren will miss the entire 2022–23 NBA season due to a Lisfranc injury in his foot that occurred during a Pro-am game.

National team career
Holmgren represented the United States at the 2021 FIBA Under-19 Basketball World Cup in Latvia. He averaged 11.9 points, 6.1 rebounds, 3.3 assists and 2.7 blocks per game, leading his team to a gold medal, and earned tournament MVP honors.

Career statistics

College

|-
| style="text-align:left;"| 2021–22
| style="text-align:left;"| Gonzaga
| 32 || 31 || 26.9 || .607 || .390 || .717 || 9.9 || 1.9 || .8 || 3.7 || 14.1

Player profile
Listed as a center, many observers note that the lanky Holmgren is a versatile player who moves, handles, shoots, and jumps fluidly and deftly, more like a guard than a big man. His vertical and running leaps are much stronger than average for a center (or power forward), and his  wingspan contributes to his standout blocking and rebounding abilities. Holmgren plays a strong inner and outer game, with superior three-point shooting compared to others of his size and position.

Personal life
Holmgren's father, Dave, who also stands , played 57 games of college basketball for Minnesota from 1984–1988. Holmgren has two sisters.

References

External links

Gonzaga Bulldogs bio
USA Basketball bio

2002 births
Living people
All-American college men's basketball players
American men's basketball players
Basketball players from Minneapolis
Centers (basketball)
Gonzaga Bulldogs men's basketball players
McDonald's High School All-Americans
Oklahoma City Thunder draft picks
Power forwards (basketball)